Tigriopus is a genus of copepods in the family Harpacticidae, containing the following species:

Tigriopus angulatus Lang, 1933
Tigriopus brachydactylus Candeias, 1959
Tigriopus brevicornis (O. F. Müller, 1776)
Tigriopus californicus (Baker, 1912)
Tigriopus crozettensis Soyer et al., 1987
Tigriopus igai Itô, 1977
Tigriopus incertus Smirnov, 1932
Tigriopus japonicus Mori, 1938
Tigriopus kerguelenensis Soyer et al., 1987
Tigriopus minutus Bozic, 1960
Tigriopus raki Bradford, 1967
Tigriopus sirindhornae Chullasorn et al., 2013
Tigriopus thailandensis Chullasorn et al., 2012

References

Harpacticoida
Copepod genera